Hasanağa may refer to the following places in Turkey:

 Hasanağa, Edirne
 Hasanağa, Nilüfer, a village in Nilüfer district of Bursa Province
 Hasanağa, Tarsus, a village in Tarsus district of Mersin Province
 Hasanağa Dam, a dam in Bursa Province

Turkish toponyms